Cathedral College, East Melbourne was an all-boy, Catholic high school, run by the Congregation of Christian Brothers, and located on Victoria Parade, at the intersection of Eades Street, in East Melbourne, Victoria, Australia. 

It was on the former site of the Christian Brother's school, Parade College, which had been relocated to Bundoora in 1968. and St Kevin's College, which moved to Toorak in 1932.

Cathedral College operated at the Victoria Parade location from 1968 and 1995, teaching classes from year 5 to year 10 & accommodated approximately 300 boys.

It was home to the renowned St Patrick's Cathedral Choir from 1968 until the schools closure, when the choristers moved to St Kevin's College. 

The Catholic Theological College currently operates on a part of the former college site, with the remainder, the original St Kevin's College building on Albert St, having been converted to apartments.

Heritage-listed building
The school building, designed by prominent 19th century architect, William Wardell, is considered to be of architectural significance within the state of Victoria, and is heritage listed.

References

Associated Catholic Colleges
Educational institutions established in 1968
1968 establishments in Australia
1995 disestablishments in Australia
Defunct Catholic schools in Australia
Former Congregation of Christian Brothers schools in Australia
East Melbourne, Victoria
Heritage-listed buildings in Melbourne
Buildings and structures in the City of Melbourne (LGA)